Dola Banerjee (born 2 June 1980) is an Indian sportswoman who competes in archery.

Early life
Dola Banerjee is daughter of Ashok Banerjee and Kalpana Banerjee. She was born in Baranagar near Kolkata. She studied in Baranagar Rajkumari Memorial Girls High School. At the age of eight, she joined Baranagar Archery Club. Her first international appearance was in Youth World Championship in San Diego in 1996

Career 

Dola Banerjee started archery at the Baranagar Archery Club in 1990 when she was barely 9 years of age. She represented  at the tender age of 16 at the Youth World Championship, San Diego in 1996. Since then she has been a regular member of the Indian women’s archery team. Dola Banerjee represented India at the 2004 Summer Olympics.  She was placed 13th in the women's individual ranking round with a 72-arrow score of 642. In the first round of elimination, she faced 52nd-ranked Kirstin Jean Lewis of South Africa. Dola fell victim to an upset, losing 141-131 in the 18-arrow match, placing 52nd overall in women's individual archery. Dola was also a member of the 8th-place Indian women's archery team.

During her 20 years in international Archery she has represented the country at more than 50 competitions including 2 Olympic Games, 3 Asian Games, 4 World Championship, 4 Asian Championship, 11 World Cups, 3 European Grand Prix, 10 Asian Grand Prix, 2 SAF Games, 1 Commonwealth Games and many others.  She has won more than 16 Gold, 3 Silver and 8 Bronze medals for the country.

Dola Banerjee won the second international gold medal of her career when she won the individual recurve title of the fourth leg of the Meteksan World Cup archery at Dover (England) in August 2007. Having won the fourth leg, she qualified for the world cup final held at Dubai in November 2007 where the winners of the four legs competed.

Dola Banerjee became world champion in archery by winning the gold medal in the women's individual recurve competition at the archery world cup held at Dubai, in November 2007. 

Dola Banerjee is the second woman archer to be honored with the Arjuna award by the Government of India in 2005.

Contribution at National Level 
At the National Level she has won more than 52 gold, 21 silver and eight bronze medals. Her absolute dominance at the Junior National Level during the five years that she played at that level is clear as she won a medal in all categories by winning 19 gold, five silver and six bronze medals. She won 30 medals out of a possibility of 30 medals.

Dola Banerjee was honored by the Indian Government when she was awarded the Arjuna Award in 2005 for her excellent contribution to Archery.

She was a Member in the Sports Development body of the West Bengal Government since July 2011 and playing a key role in development of sports in her state.

Banerjee was also a member of the Steering Committee for Youth Affairs and Sports for the Twelfth Five Year Plan.

She is also actively involved with Baranagar Archery Club, her local club where she started her career, for the development of the sport.

Presently she is employed with the Eastern Railways. She has been also part of the Railways Sports Promotion Board contingent, traveling to the London Olympics 2012 and Rio Olympics 2016.

2008 Beijing Summer Olympics
Dola represented India in the women's individual as well as team events at the 2008 Beijing Olympics, but failed to reach the finals in both events. She teamed up with Pranitha Vardhineni and Bombayala Devi in the team event. They were ranked sixth in the qualifiers. They got a bye in the round of 16, but lost to China by 206-211 in the quarterfinals. in the individual event, she was ranked 31st, and lost to Marie-Pier Beaudet of Canada by 8-10 in the tie break, after scoring 108-108 in the full set of arrows.

2010 Delhi Commonwealth Games
In Commonwealth Games 2010 in New Delhi, she won Gold Medal in Women's Team Recurve with Deepika Kumari and L Bombayala Devi

She also won a Bronze medal on the Recurve Individual event.

Achievements 

  Arjuna Award on the year of 2005.
 1st woman who have qualified for Olympic in the individual event on 2004 Athens Olympic.
 Won Individual Gold on 2007 World Cup and as well as World Cup Final on the same year. 
 Won gold in the 2010 Commonwealth games.
 Team Bronze in the Asian Games in 2010.

Personal life
Dola Banerjee is married to a corporate professional, Medhadeep Banerjee. and is a mother of a son, Diyan. Her younger brother Rahul Banerjee is also an archer. She is a cousin of the singers Shaan and Sagarika.

See also
 Archery at the 2010 Commonwealth Games
 Indian Squad for 2008 Olympics

References

External links 
 
 
 

1980 births
21st-century Indian women
21st-century Indian people
Archers at the 2002 Asian Games
Archers at the 2004 Summer Olympics
Archers at the 2006 Asian Games
Archers at the 2008 Summer Olympics
Archers at the 2010 Asian Games
Archers at the 2010 Commonwealth Games
Archers from Kolkata
Asian Games bronze medalists for India
Asian Games medalists in archery
Commonwealth Games bronze medallists for India
Commonwealth Games gold medallists for India
Commonwealth Games medallists in archery
Indian female archers
Living people
Medalists at the 2010 Asian Games
Olympic archers of India
People from Baranagar
Recipients of the Arjuna Award
Sportswomen from Kolkata
Indian sports executives and administrators
Medallists at the 2010 Commonwealth Games